Dindica wytsmani is a moth of the family Geometridae first described by Louis Beethoven Prout in 1927. It is found in Sikkim, India.

References

Pseudoterpnini
Taxa named by Louis Beethoven Prout
Moths described in 1927